Bangladesh Accreditation Council (BAC) is an autonomous government agency responsible to accredit higher education institutes  and academic program offering entities for quality assurance leading to international recognition.

History

The council is established under the Bangladesh Accreditation Council Act, 2017. Bangladesh Accreditation Council Act, 2017 was passed in the Jatiya Sangsad (National Parliament) of Bangladesh in March 2017. Mesbahuddin Ahmed was appointed as the first chairman of the council in August 2018. Education minister Dipu Moni inaugurated the office of Bangladesh Accreditation Council at Mohakhali in May 2019. The appointment of four full-time members of the council was completed in June 2019. The first council meeting was held at BAC office, Mohakhali on December 22, 2019.

Objectives

 Facilitate the implementation of quality assurance mechanism and national qualifications framework at the higher education institution (HEI) and program levels.
 Provide standards, guidelines and code of best practice to the higher education institutions (HEIs) for self-assessment and developing internal quality assurance culture.
 Provide advisory services to the HEIs or program offering entities to prepare them for accreditation;
 Facilitate the adoption of quality assurance standards by the HEIs and program offering entities.
 Conduct external quality assessment of HEIs and academic programs and provide feedback for further improvement and accreditation.
 Conduct training, workshop, conference to motivate the higher education community towards accreditation and capacity building.
 Conduct or commission research on quality assurance and appropriateness of the standards in higher education.
 Maintain liaison and cooperation with credible international quality assurance networks and accreditation bodies in higher education.

References

External links
 

2017 establishments in Bangladesh
Organisations based in Dhaka
Government agencies of Bangladesh
Government agencies established in 2017